= Newfoundland Holiday =

- Genre: Nature and travel
- Presented by: Dave Quinton
- Country of origin: Canada
- Original language: English
- No. of seasons: 1

Production
- Producer: Derm Breen
- Production location: St. John's
- Running time: 30 minutes

Original release
- Network: CBC Television
- Release: 7 June 1973 – 5 September 1974

Newfoundland Holiday is a Canadian nature and travel documentary television series that aired on CBC Television from 1973 to 1974.

== Premise ==
Dave Quinton hosted this series profiled various locations in Newfoundland, particularly featuring its nature and wildlife. Some filmed material from the Newfoundland Tourist Bureau was included in the series. Newfoundland Holiday was produced in St. John's.

== Scheduling ==
This half-hour series was broadcast on Thursday afternoons for two seasons, first at 5:00 p.m. (Eastern) from 7 June to 16 August 1973 then at 4:30 p.m. from 4 July to 5 September 1974.
